Roy Gordon Holdstock (26 December 1955) is an English former professional rugby league footballer who played in the 1970s and 1980s.

Background
Roy Holdstock was born in Kingston upon Hull, East Riding of Yorkshire, England.

Playing career

International honours
Roy Holdstock won caps for England while at Hull Kingston Rovers in 1980 against Wales and France, in 1981 against Wales, and won caps for Great Britain while at Hull Kingston Rovers in 1980 against New Zealand (2 matches).

Challenge Cup Final appearances
Roy Holdstock played  left-, i.e. number 8, in Hull Kingston Rovers' 10-5 victory over Hull F.C. in the 1979–80 Challenge Cup Final during the 1979–80 season at Wembley Stadium, London, on Saturday 3 May 1980, in front of a crowd of 95,000, and played left- in the 9-18 defeat by Widnes, in the 1980–81 Challenge Cup Final during the 1980–81 season at Wembley Stadium, London, on Saturday 2 May 1981, in front of a crowd of 92,496.

County Cup Final appearances
Roy Holdstock played  left-, i.e. number 8, in Hull Kingston Rovers' 7-8 defeat by Leeds in the 1980–81 Yorkshire County Cup Final during the 1979–80 season at Fartown, Huddersfield on Saturday 8 November 1980.

BBC2 Floodlit Trophy Final appearances
Roy Holdstock played  left-, i.e. number 8, in Hull Kingston Rovers' 3-13 defeat by Hull F.C. in the 1979 BBC2 Floodlit Trophy Final during the 1979–80 season at the Boulevard, Hull on Tuesday 18 December 1979.

John Player Trophy Final appearances
Roy Holdstock played  left-, i.e. number 8, in Hull Kingston Rovers' 4-12 defeat by Hull F.C. in the 1981–82 John Player Trophy Final during the 1981–82 season at HeadingleyRugby Stadium, Leeds on Saturday 23 January 1982.

Club career
Roy Holdstock made his début for Wakefield Trinity during January 1986, and he played his last match for Wakefield Trinity during the 1985–86 season.

Testimonial match
Roy Holdstock's Testimonial match at Hull Kingston Rovers took place in 1984.

References

External links

1955 births
Living people
England national rugby league team players
English rugby league players
Great Britain national rugby league team players
Hull Kingston Rovers players
Rugby league players from Kingston upon Hull
Rugby league props
Wakefield Trinity players